Ganton Golf Club is an 18-hole golf course in Ganton, North Yorkshire, England.

Founded in 1891, the course was initially designed by Tom Chisholm and Robert Bird, but modifications to the course have been made since by a number of people including James Braid, Alister MacKenzie, Harry Colt, John Henry Taylor, and Harry Vardon.

Competitions at Ganton
The course has been the venue for a number of amateur and professional competitions including the 1949 Ryder Cup, the 2000 Curtis Cup, the 2003 Walker Cup and The Amateur Championship (1964, 1977, 1991) and the English Amateur (1933, 1947, 1955, 1968, 1976), (2016 in conjunction with South Cliff Golf Club, Scarborough). In 2017 it hosted the 128th Varsity Match between Oxford and Cambridge universities.

References
Official Site

Golf clubs and courses in North Yorkshire
Golf clubs and courses designed by Harry Colt
Ryder Cup venues
Curtis Cup venues
Walker Cup venues
Sports venues completed in 1891
1891 establishments in England
Ganton